The 1904 United States presidential election in Montana took place on November 8, 1904 as part of the 1904 United States presidential election. Voters chose three representatives, or electors to the Electoral College, who voted for president and vice president.

Montana overwhelmingly voted for the Republican nominee, President Theodore Roosevelt, over the Democratic nominee, former Chief Judge of New York Court of Appeals Alton B. Parker. Roosevelt won Montana by a landslide margin of 20.42%. It was the first time Montana was won by a Republican candidate since it was won by Benjamin Harrison in 1892.

Results

Results by county

See also
 United States presidential elections in Montana

References

Montana
1904
1904 Montana elections